Alexey Sergeevich Kulikov (born February 11, 1994) is a Russian curler. He currently plays lead for the Russian national men's curling team on 2018 European Curling Championships.

Awards
 Master of Sports of Russia (curling, 2015).
 Russian Men's Curling Championship: silver (2017), bronze (2018).
 Russian Men's Curling Cup: silver (2016).
 Russian Mixed Curling Championship: bronze (2014).
 Russian Mixed Doubles Curling Cup: silver (2015)

Teams and events

Men's

Mixed

Mixed doubles

References

External links

Living people
1994 births
Russian male curlers